Botanical gardens in Colombia have collections consisting entirely of Colombia native and endemic species; most have a collection that include plants from around the world. There are botanical gardens and arboreta in all states and territories of Colombia, most are administered by local governments, some are privately owned.

 Red Nacional de Jardines Botánicos de Colombia
 Jardín Botánico de Cartagena
 Jardín Botánico del Pacífico, Chocó
 Jardín Botánico del Quindio
 Bogotá Botanical Garden
 Fundación Jardín Etnobotánico Villa Ludovica
 Jardín Botánico de Cali
 Jardín Botánico de San Andrés

References 

Colombia
Botanical gardens